We Are Buono! is the third album from the J-pop idol group, Buono!. The album was released on February 10, 2010, under the Pony Canyon label. A limited edition version included a trading card selected randomly from four, and a DVD.

Track listings

CD
 "One Way = My Way"
 "Our Songs"
 
 "MY BOY"
 
 "Take It Easy!"
 "Bravo☆Bravo"
 
 "Blue-Sky-Blue"

References

External links 
 Buono! discography entry at the Hello! Project official site 

2010 albums
Buono! albums
Pony Canyon albums